André Pompon (2 July 1904 – 11 October 1967) was a French racing cyclist. He rode in the 1924 Tour de France.

References

1904 births
1967 deaths
French male cyclists
Place of birth missing